Topology is an indie classical quintet from Australia, formed in 1997. A leading Australian new music ensemble, they perform throughout Australia and abroad and have to date released 14 albums, including one with rock/electronica band Full Fathom Five and one with contemporary ensemble Loops. They were formerly the resident ensembles at the University of Western Sydney and Brisbane Powerhouse. The group works with composers including Tim Brady, Andrew Poppy, Michael Nyman, Jeremy Peyton Jones, Terry Riley, Steve Reich, Philip Glass, Carl Stone, Paul Dresher, as well as with many Australian composers.

In 2009, Topology won the Outstanding Contribution by an Organization award at the Australasian Performing Right Association (APRA) Classical Music Awards for their work on the 2008 Brisbane Powerhouse Series.

Members

 Bernard Hoey (viola)
 Christa Powell (violin)
 John Babbage (saxophone)
 Kylie Davidson (piano)
 Therese Milanovic (piano)
 Robert Davidson (bass)

Discography

Albums

Awards and nominations

APRA Awards
APRA Awards of 2009: Outstanding Contribution by an Organisation win for the 2008 Brisbane Powerhouse Series by Topology.

ARIA Music Awards
The ARIA Music Awards are presented annually from 1987 by the Australian Recording Industry Association (ARIA). 

! 
|-
| 2014
| Share House
| Best Classical Album
| 
| 
|-

References

External links
Official website
Official Facebook Page
Official YouTube Page
Official Twitter Page

APRA Award winners
Contemporary classical music ensembles
New South Wales musical groups
Musical groups from Brisbane